D43 is a state road in the central Croatia connecting Đurđevac, Bjelovar, Čazma and Ivanić Grad to the A3 motorway at its southern terminus, within Ivanić Grad interchange.

The road, as well as all other state roads in Croatia, is managed and maintained by Hrvatske ceste, state owned company.

Traffic volume 

Traffic is regularly counted and reported by Hrvatske ceste, operator of the road.

Road junctions and populated areas

Maps

Sources

D043
D043
D043
D043